Rachael Zoa Maza  is an Indigenous Australian television and film actress and stage director.

Early life and education
Maza is of Dutch, Torres Strait Islander and Aboriginal Australian heritage, the daughter of Bob Maza, also an actor.

She is a graduate of the Western Australian Academy of Performing Arts.

Career

Television and film
Maza worked as a TV presenter on ABC Television's weekly show focusing on Indigenous Australians, Message Stick. and SBS's ICAM.

She has numerous credits as an actor in television series, including Wentworth, Winners and Losers, Halifax f.p., Stingers, SeaChange, Heartland (in which her father also had a role), A Country Practice and Miss Fisher's Murder Mysteries.

She acted in the films Cosi (1996), Radiance (1998), and Lillian's Story (1996).

Stage
Maza worked with Company B and Wesley Enoch for many years, with her performances at the Belvoir St Theatre including leading roles in Conversations with the Dead and The Dreamers. She again worked with Enoch in The Sapphires, staged by the Melbourne Theatre Company and Sydney Festival.

She has worked as part of The Black Arm Band and as the director of Lou Bennett's play Show Us Your Tiddas!.

, Maza is artistic director of Ilbijerri Theatre Company.

Recognition
Order of Australia, 2020, for significant service to the performing arts as an Artistic Director
Green Room Award – Best Performance by an Actress in a Leading Role, for Holy Day
Sydney Theatre Critics Circle Award – Best Performance, for Radiance

Family
Maza has a son, Ariel, with actor Tom Long.

References

External links

Living people
Australian film actresses
Australian musical theatre actresses
Indigenous Australian actresses
Torres Strait Islanders
Year of birth missing (living people)